Cendrawasih Papua F.C. was an Indonesian football club based in Jayapura in the province of Papua. The team plays in the Liga Primer Indonesia and was a founding member of the league.

Team Officials

References

External links
Cendrawasih Papua FC at ligaprimerindonesia.co.id

Defunct football clubs in Indonesia
Football clubs in Indonesia
Association football clubs established in 2010
2010 establishments in Indonesia